This is a list of the 644 accepted species in the genus Ipomoea.

Ipomoea species 

 Ipomoea abrupta R.Br.
 Ipomoea abutiloides (Kunth) G.Don
 Ipomoea abyssinica (Choisy) Hochst.
 Ipomoea acanthocarpa (Choisy) Hochst. ex Schweinf. & Asch.
 Ipomoea acrensis J.R.I.Wood & Scotland
 Ipomoea aculeata Blume
 Ipomoea acutisepala O'Donell
 Ipomoea adenioides Schinz
 Ipomoea adumbrata Rendle & Britten
 Ipomoea aemilii (O'Donell) J.R.I.Wood & R.Degen
 Ipomoea aequiloba J.R.I.Wood & Scotland
 Ipomoea alba L. – moon vine
 Ipomoea albivenia (Lindl.) Sweet
 Ipomoea alexandrae D.F.Austin
 Ipomoea alterniflora Griseb.
 Ipomoea altoamazonica J.R.I.Wood & Scotland
 Ipomoea altoparanaensis O'Donell
 Ipomoea amazonica (D.F.Austin & Staples) J.R.I.Wood & Scotland
 Ipomoea amnicola Morong – red-center morning glory
 Ipomoea ampullacea Fernald
 Ipomoea ana-mariae L.V.Vasconc. & Sim.-Bianch.
 Ipomoea androyensis Deroin
 Ipomoea anemophoba Chiov.
 Ipomoea angustisepala O'Donell
 Ipomoea angustissima  J.R.I.Wood & Scotland
 Ipomoea anisomeres B.L.Rob. & Bartlett
 Ipomoea antonschmidii R.W.Johnson
 Ipomoea appendiculata J.R.I.Wood & Scotland
 Ipomoea aprica House
 Ipomoea aquatica Forssk. – water spinach, water morning glory, water convolvulus, "Chinese spinach", "swamp cabbage"
 Ipomoea arborescens (Humb. & Bonpl. ex Willd.) G.Don
 Ipomoea ardissima A.Chev.
 Ipomoea arenicola Rendle & Britten
 Ipomoea argentaurata Hallier f.
 Ipomoea argentea Meisn.
 Ipomoea argentifolia A.Rich.
 Ipomoea argentinica Peter
 Ipomoea argillicola R.W.Johnson
 Ipomoea argyreia (Mart. ex Choisy) Meisn.
 Ipomoea argyrophylla Vatke
 Ipomoea aristolochiifolia G.Don
 Ipomoea asarifolia (Desr.) Roem. & Schult.
 Ipomoea asclepiadea Hallier f.
 Ipomoea aspera (Choisy) Vatke
 Ipomoea asplundii O'Donell
 Ipomoea asterophora Ooststr.
 Ipomoea atacorensis A.Chev.
 Ipomoea attenuata J.R.I.Wood & Scotland
 Ipomoea aurantiaca L.O.Williams
 Ipomoea aurifolia Dammer
 Ipomoea austrobrasiliensis J.R.I.Wood & Scotland
 Ipomoea bahiensis Willd.
 Ipomoea bakeri Britten
 Ipomoea balioclada Urb.
 Ipomoea bampsiana Lejoly & Lisowski
 Ipomoea barbatisepala A.Gray
 Ipomoea barlerioides (Choisy) Benth. ex C.B.Clarke
 Ipomoea barteri Baker
 Ipomoea batatas (L.) Lam. – sweet potato, "tuberous morning glory"
 Ipomoea batatoides Choisy
 Ipomoea bathycolpos Hallier f.
 Ipomoea beninensis Akoègn., Lisowski & Sinsin
 Ipomoea bernoulliana Peter
 Ipomoea biflora (L.) Pers.
 Ipomoea bisavium A.Meeuse
 Ipomoea blanchetii Choisy
 Ipomoea blepharophylla Hallier f.
 Ipomoea bolusiana Schinz
 Ipomoea bombycina (Choisy) Benth. & Hook.f. ex Hemsl.
 Ipomoea bonariensis Hook.
 Ipomoea bracteata Cav.
 Ipomoea bracteolata R.W.Johnson
 Ipomoea brasiliana (Mart. ex Choisy) Meisn.
 Ipomoea brassii C.T.White
 Ipomoea brownii Roem. & Schult.
 Ipomoea bullata Oliv.
 Ipomoea burchellii Meisn.
 Ipomoea cairica (L.) Sweet – Coast morning glory, Cairo morning glory, mile-a-minute vine, Messina creeper, railroad creeper
 Ipomoea calantha Griseb.
 Ipomoea calobra F.Muell.
 Ipomoea caloneura Meisn.
 Ipomoea calophylla C.Wright ex Griseb.
 Ipomoea calyptrata Dammer
 Ipomoea cambodiensis Gagnep. & Courchet
 Ipomoea campanulata L.
 Ipomoea campestris Meisn.
 Ipomoea capillacea (Kunth) G.Don
 Ipomoea capitellata Choisy
 Ipomoea cardenasiana O'Donell
 Ipomoea cardiophylla A.Gray
 Ipomoea carnea Jacq. – pink morning glory
 Ipomoea carolina L.
 Ipomoea caudata Fernald
 Ipomoea cavalcantei D.F.Austin
 Ipomoea cearensis O'Donell
 Ipomoea cerradoensis J.R.I.Wood & Scotland
 Ipomoea chamelana J.A.McDonald
 Ipomoea chapadensis J.R.I.Wood & L.V.Vasconc.
 Ipomoea cheirophylla O'Donell
 Ipomoea chenopodifolia (M.Martens & Galeotti) Hemsl.
 Ipomoea chiliantha Hallier f.
 Ipomoea chilopsidis Standl.
 Ipomoea chiquitensis J.R.I.Wood & Scotland
 Ipomoea chiriquensis Standl.
 Ipomoea chloroneura Hallier f.
 Ipomoea chodatiana O'Donell
 Ipomoea cholulensis Kunth
 Ipomoea chondrosepala Hallier f.
 Ipomoea chrysocalyx D.F.Austin
 Ipomoea chrysochaetia Hallier f.
 Ipomoea chrysosperma Hallier f.
 Ipomoea cicatricosa Baker
 Ipomoea ciervensis House
 Ipomoea citrina Hallier f.
 Ipomoea clarensis Alain
 Ipomoea clarkei Hook.f.
 Ipomoea clausa Rudolph ex Ledeb.
 Ipomoea clavata (G.Don) Ooststr. ex J.F.Macbr.
 Ipomoea coccinea L. – red morning glory, redstar, Mexican morning glory
 Ipomoea colombiana O'Donell
 Ipomoea concolora (Matuda) D.F.Austin
 Ipomoea connata J.R.I.Wood & L.V.Vasconc.
 Ipomoea consimilis Schulze-Menz
 Ipomoea convolvulifolia Hallier f.
 Ipomoea conzattii Greenm.
 Ipomoea coptica (L.) Roth ex Roem. & Schult.
 Ipomoea cordatotriloba Dennst. – little violet morning glory, purple bindweed
 Ipomoea cordillerae J.R.I.Wood & Scotland
 Ipomoea cordofana Choisy
 Ipomoea coriacea Choisy
 Ipomoea corrugata Thulin
 Ipomoea corymbosa (L.) Roth – heart-leaved morning glory
 Ipomoea coscinosperma Hochst. ex Choisy
 Ipomoea costata F.Muell. ex Benth. – rock morning glory, bush potato
 Ipomoea costellata Torr. – crest-ribbed morning glory
 Ipomoea crassipes Hook.
 Ipomoea crepidiformis Hallier f.
 Ipomoea crinicalyx S.Moore
 Ipomoea crispa (Thunb.) Hallier f.
 Ipomoea cristulata Hallier f. – trans-Pecos morning glory
 Ipomoea cryptica J.R.I.Wood & Scotland
 Ipomoea cubensis (House) Urb.
 Ipomoea cuneifolia Meisn.
 Ipomoea cuprinacoma E.Carranza & J.A.McDonald
 Ipomoea curtipes Rendle
 Ipomoea cuscoensis J.R.I.Wood & P.Muñoz
 Ipomoea cynanchifolia Meisn.
 Ipomoea darainensis Deroin, Ranir. & Nusb.
 Ipomoea dasycarpa J.R.I.Wood & Scotland
 Ipomoea daturiflora Meisn.
 Ipomoea decaisnei Ooststr.
 Ipomoea decemcornuta O'Donell
 Ipomoea decipiens Dammer
 Ipomoea delphinioides Choisy
 Ipomoea delpierrei De Wild.
 Ipomoea deminuta J.R.I.Wood & Scotland
 Ipomoea densibracteata O'Donell
 Ipomoea densivestita R.W.Johnson
 Ipomoea descolei O'Donell
 Ipomoea desmophylla Bojer ex Choisy
 Ipomoea desrousseauxii Steud.
 Ipomoea diamantinensis J.M.Black ex Eardley
 Ipomoea diantha Roem. & Schult.
 Ipomoea dichroa Hochst. ex Choisy
 Ipomoea diegoae M.C.Lara
 Ipomoea digitata L.
 Ipomoea discoidea Gonz.-Martínez & J.Jiménez Ram.
 Ipomoea discolor (Kunth) G.Don
 Ipomoea distans Choisy
 Ipomoea diversifolia R.Br.
 Ipomoea dolichopoda J.R.I.Wood & Scotland
 Ipomoea donaldsonii Rendle
 Ipomoea dubia Roem. & Schult.
 Ipomoea dumetorum (Kunth) Willd. – railwaycreeper
 Ipomoea dumosa (Benth.) L.O.Williams
 Ipomoea dunlopii R.W.Johnson
 Ipomoea durangensis House
 Ipomoea duvigneaudii Lejoly & Lisowski
 Ipomoea echinocalyx Meisn.
 Ipomoea edithae Gage
 Ipomoea eggersiana Peter – Egger's morning glory
 Ipomoea electrina D.F.Austin & J.A.McDonald
 Ipomoea elongata Choisy
 Ipomoea elytrocephala Hallier f.
 Ipomoea emeiensis Z.Y.Zhu
 Ipomoea emetica Choisy
 Ipomoea ensiformis J.R.I.Wood & Scotland
 Ipomoea ephemera Verdc.
 Ipomoea eremnobrocha D.F.Austin
 Ipomoea eriocalyx (Mart. ex Choisy) Meisn.
 Ipomoea eriocarpa R.Br.
 Ipomoea erioleuca Hallier f.
 Ipomoea erosa Urb.
 Ipomoea estrellensis Hassl. ex O'Donell
 Ipomoea eurysepala Hallier f.
 Ipomoea eximia House
 Ipomoea expansa A.McDonald
 Ipomoea exserta J.R.I.Wood & Scotland
 Ipomoea falkioides Griseb.
 Ipomoea fanshawei Verdc.
 Ipomoea fasciculata J.R.I.Wood & Scotland
 Ipomoea ficifolia Lindl.
 Ipomoea fiebrigii Hassl. ex O'Donell
 Ipomoea fimbriosepala Choisy
 Ipomoea fissifolia (McPherson) Eckenw.
 Ipomoea flavivillosa Schulze-Menz
 Ipomoea franciscana Choisy
 Ipomoea fuchsioides Griseb.
 Ipomoea fulvicaulis (Hochst. ex Choisy) Boiss. ex Hallier f.
 Ipomoea funicularis R.W.Johnson
 Ipomoea funis Cham. & Schltdl.
 Ipomoea furcyensis Urb.
 Ipomoea galactorrhoea Hallier f.
 Ipomoea galhareriana Thulin
 Ipomoea garckeana Vatke
 Ipomoea geophilifolia K.Afzel.
 Ipomoea gesnerioides J.A.McDonald
 Ipomoea gigantea (Silva Manso) Choisy
 Ipomoea gilana K.Keith & J.A.McDonald
 Ipomoea gloverae J.A.McDonald
 Ipomoea goyazensis Gardner
 Ipomoea gracilis R.Br.
 Ipomoea gracilisepala Rendle
 Ipomoea graminea R.Br.
 Ipomoea graminifolia J.R.I.Wood & Scotland
 Ipomoea grandifolia (Dammer) O'Donell
 Ipomoea graniticola J.R.I.Wood & Scotland
 Ipomoea grantii Oliv.
 Ipomoea granulosa Chodat & Hassl.
 Ipomoea guaranitica Chodat & Hassl.
 Ipomoea gypsophila J.R.I.Wood & Scotland
 Ipomoea habeliana Oliv.
 Ipomoea hackeliana (Schinz) Hallier f.
 Ipomoea haenkeana Choisy
 Ipomoea harlingii D.F.Austin
 Ipomoea harmandii Gagnep.
 Ipomoea hartmannii Vatke & Rensch
 Ipomoea hartwegii Benth.
 Ipomoea hastifolia Domin
 Ipomoea hastigera Kunth
 Ipomoea hederacea Jacq. – ivy-leaved morning glory
 Ipomoea hederifolia L. – scarlet morning glory, scarlet creeper, star ipomoea
 Ipomoea heptaphylla Sweet – Wright's morning glory
 Ipomoea herpeana Deroin
 Ipomoea heterodoxa Standl. & Steyerm.
 Ipomoea heterosepala Baker
 Ipomoea heterotricha Didr.
 Ipomoea hewittacea (Kuntze) J.R.I.Wood & Scotland
 Ipomoea hieronymi (Kuntze) O'Donell
 Ipomoea hildebrandtii Vatke
 Ipomoea hiranensis Thulin
 Ipomoea hirsutissima Gardner
 Ipomoea hirtifolia R.C.Fang & S.H.Huang
 Ipomoea hochstetteri House
 Ipomoea holubii Baker
 Ipomoea homotrichoidea O'Donell
 Ipomoea horsfalliae Hook. – Lady Doorly's morning glory, cardinal creeper, Prince Kuhio vine
 Ipomoea huayllae J.R.I.Wood & Scotland
 Ipomoea humidicola Verdc.
 Ipomoea hypargyrea Griseb.
 Ipomoea ignava House
 Ipomoea imperati (Vahl) Griseb.
 Ipomoea inaccessa J.R.I.Wood & Scotland
 Ipomoea incarnata (Vahl) Choisy
 Ipomoea incerta  (Britton) Urb.
 Ipomoea indica (Burm.) Merr. – oceanblue morning glory, blue morning glory, blue dawn flower
 Ipomoea indivisa (Vell.) Hallier f.
 Ipomoea intrapilosa Rose
 Ipomoea invicta House
 Ipomoea involucrata P.Beauv.
 Ipomoea irwiniae Verdc.
 Ipomoea isthmica J.R.I.Wood & Buril
 Ipomoea itapuaensis J.R.I.Wood & R.Degen
 Ipomoea jacalana Matuda
 Ipomoea jaegeri Pilg.
 Ipomoea jalapa (L.) Pursh
 Ipomoea jalapoides Griseb.
 Ipomoea jamaicensis G.Don
 Ipomoea jicama Brandegee
 Ipomoea johnsoniana R.L.Barrett
 Ipomoea jucunda Thwaites
 Ipomoea jujuyensis O'Donell
 Ipomoea juliagutierreziae J.R.I.Wood & Scotland
 Ipomoea kahloae Gonz.-Martínez, Lozada-Pérez & Rios-Carr.
 Ipomoea kalumburu R.W.Johnson
 Ipomoea kassneri Rendle
 Ipomoea katangensis Lisowski & Wiland
 Ipomoea keraudreniae Deroin
 Ipomoea killipiana O'Donell
 Ipomoea kilwaensis Pilg.
 Ipomoea kituiensis Vatke
 Ipomoea kotschyana Hochst. ex Choisy
 Ipomoea kraholandica J.R.I.Wood & Scotland
 Ipomoea kruseana Matuda
 Ipomoea kunthiana Meisn.
 Ipomoea lachnaea Spreng.
 Ipomoea lactifera J.R.I.Wood & Scotland
 Ipomoea lacunosa L. – whitestar potato, whitestar
 Ipomoea laeta A.Gray ex S.Watson
 Ipomoea lambii Fernald
 Ipomoea lanata E.A.Bruce
 Ipomoea langsdorffii Choisy
 Ipomoea lanuginosa O'Donell
 Ipomoea lapathifolia Hallier f.
 Ipomoea lapidosa Vatke
 Ipomoea laxiflora H.J.Chowdhery & Debta
 Ipomoea lenis House
 Ipomoea leonensis B.L.Rob.
 Ipomoea lepidophora Lebrun & Taton
 Ipomoea leprieurii D.F.Austin
 Ipomoea leptophylla Torr. – bush morning glory, bush moonflower, manroot
 Ipomoea × leucantha Jacq.
 Ipomoea leucanthemum (Klotzsch) Hallier f.
 Ipomoea leucotricha Donn.Sm.
 Ipomoea lilloana O'Donell
 Ipomoea limosa R.W.Johnson
 Ipomoea lindenii M.Martens & Galeotti
 Ipomoea lindheimeri A.Gray – Lindheimer's morning glory
 Ipomoea lindmanii Urb.
 Ipomoea lineolata Urb.
 Ipomoea linosepala Hallier f.
 Ipomoea littoralis Blume – white-flowered beach morning glory
 Ipomoea livescens (Schltdl. ex Kunze) Meisn.
 Ipomoea lobata (Cerv.) Thell. – fire vine, Spanish flag
 Ipomoea lonchophylla J.M.Black
 Ipomoea longeramosa Choisy
 Ipomoea longibarbis J.R.I.Wood & Scotland
 Ipomoea longibracteolata Sim.-Bianch. & J.R.I.Wood
 Ipomoea longifolia Benth. – pink-throated morning glory
 Ipomoea longirostra J.R.I.Wood & Scotland
 Ipomoea longistaminea O'Donell
 Ipomoea longituba Hallier f.
 Ipomoea lottiae J.A.McDonald
 Ipomoea lozanii Painter ex House
 Ipomoea lutea Hemsl.
 Ipomoea luteoviridis Ekman & Leonard
 Ipomoea macarenaensis J.R.I.Wood & Scotland
 Ipomoea macdonaldii E.Carranza
 Ipomoea macedoi Hoehne
 Ipomoea macrorhiza Michx. – large-rooted morning glory
 Ipomoea macrosepala Brenan
 Ipomoea macrosiphon Hallier f.
 Ipomoea madrensis S.Watson
 Ipomoea magna Sim.-Bianch. & J.R.I.Wood
 Ipomoea magniflora O'Donell
 Ipomoea magnifolia Rusby
 Ipomoea magnusiana Schinz
 Ipomoea mairetii Choisy
 Ipomoea malpighipila O'Donell
 Ipomoea malvaeoides Meisn.
 Ipomoea malvaviscoides Meisn.
 Ipomoea marabensis D.F.Austin & Secco
 Ipomoea maranyonensis J.R.I.Wood & Scotland
 Ipomoea marcellia Meisn.
 Ipomoea marginisepala O'Donell
 Ipomoea marmorata Britten & Rendle
 Ipomoea mathewsiana Kuntze
 Ipomoea maurandioides Meisn.
 Ipomoea mauritiana Jacq. – giant potato
 Ipomoea mcphersonii D.F.Austin
 Ipomoea mcvaughii McPherson
 Ipomoea megalantha J.R.I.Wood & Scotland
 Ipomoea megapotamica Choisy
 Ipomoea melancholica J.R.I.Wood & Buril
 Ipomoea mendozae J.R.I.Wood & Scotland
 Ipomoea merremioides Alain
 Ipomoea meyeri (Spreng.) G.Don – Meyer's morning glory
 Ipomoea micrantha Hallier f.
 Ipomoea microcalyx Schulze-Menz
 Ipomoea microdactyla Griseb. – calcareous morning glory
 Ipomoea microdonta J.R.I.Wood & Scotland
 Ipomoea microsepala Benth.
 Ipomoea milnei Verdc.
 Ipomoea minutiflora  M.Martens & Galeotti) House
 Ipomoea miquihuanensis J.A.McDonald
 Ipomoea mirabilis P.P.A.Ferreira & Sim.-Bianch.
 Ipomoea mirandina (Pittier) O'Donell
 Ipomoea mitchellae Standl.
 Ipomoea mombassana Vatke
 Ipomoea montecristina Hadac
 Ipomoea morongii Britton
 Ipomoea mucronatoproducta J.R.I.Wood & Scotland
 Ipomoea mucronifolia J.R.I.Wood & Scotland
 Ipomoea muelleri Benth.
 Ipomoea muricata (L.) Jacq. – lilacbell
 Ipomoea murucoides Roem. & Schult.
 Ipomoea nationis (Hook.) G.Nicholson
 Ipomoea neei (Spreng.) O'Donell
 Ipomoea nematoloba Urb.
 Ipomoea nematophylla Urb.
 Ipomoea nephrosepala Chiov.
 Ipomoea neurocephala Hallier f.
 Ipomoea nil (L.) Roth – white-edged morning glory, ivy morning glory, Japanese morning glory
 Ipomoea nitida Griseb.
 Ipomoea noctulifolia McPherson
 Ipomoea noemana Jara
 Ipomoea nyctaginea Choisy
 Ipomoea oblongata E.Mey. ex Choisy
 Ipomoea oblongifolia (Hassl.) O'Donell
 Ipomoea obscura (L.) Ker Gawl. – obscure morning glory, small white morning glory
 Ipomoea ochracea (Lindl.) Sweet – fence morning glory
 Ipomoea odontophylla J.R.I.Wood & Scotland
 Ipomoea oenotherae (Vatke) Hallier f.
 Ipomoea oenotheroides (L.f.) A.Meeuse & Welman
 Ipomoea ommanneyi Rendle
 Ipomoea ophiodes Standl. & Steyerm.
 Ipomoea opulifolia Rusby
 Ipomoea oranensis O'Donell
 Ipomoea orizabensis (G.Pelletan) Ledeb. ex Steud.
 Ipomoea ovatolanceolata (Hallier f.) Thulin
 Ipomoea padillae O'Donell
 Ipomoea paludicola J.R.I.Wood & Scotland
 Ipomoea paludosa O'Donell
 Ipomoea pampeana P.P.A.Ferreira & Miotto
 Ipomoea pandurata (L.) G.Mey. – wild potato vine, big-rooted morning glory, man-of-the-earth, manroot
 Ipomoea pantanalensis J.R.I.Wood & Urbanetz
 Ipomoea paolii Chiov.
 Ipomoea papilio Hallier f.
 Ipomoea paradae J.R.I.Wood & Scotland
 Ipomoea paraguariensis Peter
 Ipomoea paranaensis Hoehne
 Ipomoea parasitica (Kunth) G.Don
 Ipomoea parvibracteolata J.R.I.Wood & L.V.Vasconc.
 Ipomoea passifloroides House
 Ipomoea pauciflora M.Martens & Galeotti
 Ipomoea paulistana (Silva Manso) Stellfeld
 Ipomoea paulitschkei Schweinf. & Volkens
 Ipomoea pearceana Kuntze
 Ipomoea pedicellaris Benth.
 Ipomoea pellita Hallier f.
 Ipomoea perpartita McPherson
 Ipomoea perrieri Deroin
 Ipomoea peruviana O'Donell
 Ipomoea pes-caprae (L.) R.Br. – beach morning glory, goat's foot
 Ipomoea pes-tigridis L.
 Ipomoea peteri (Kuntze) Staples & Govaerts
 Ipomoea petitiana Lejoly & Lisowski
 Ipomoea petrophila House
 Ipomoea philomega (Vell.) House
 Ipomoea pierrei Gagnep.
 Ipomoea pileata Roxb.
 Ipomoea pinifolia Meisn.
 Ipomoea pintoi O'Donell
 Ipomoea pittieri O'Donell
 Ipomoea platensis Ker Gawl.
 Ipomoea plummerae A.Gray – Huachuca Mountain morning glory
 Ipomoea pogonantha Thulin
 Ipomoea pogonocalyx J.R.I.Wood & Scotland
 Ipomoea pohlii Choisy
 Ipomoea polhillii Verdc.
 Ipomoea polpha R.W.Johnson
 Ipomoea polymorpha Roem. & Schult.
 Ipomoea polyrrhizos (Silva Manso) Choisy
 Ipomoea populina House
 Ipomoea porrecta Rendle & Britten
 Ipomoea praecana House
 Ipomoea praecox C.Wright
 Ipomoea praematura Eckenw.
 Ipomoea prismatosyphon Welw.
 Ipomoea procumbens Mart. ex Choisy
 Ipomoea procurrens Meisn.
 Ipomoea prolifera J.R.I.Wood & Scotland
 Ipomoea protea Rendle & Britten
 Ipomoea proxima (M.Martens & Galeotti) Godm. & Salvin
 Ipomoea pruinosa McPherson
 Ipomoea psammophila J.R.I.Wood & Scotland
 Ipomoea pseudomarginata Deroin
 Ipomoea pseudoracemosa McPherson
 Ipomoea pterocaulis J.R.I.Wood & L.V.Vasconc.
 Ipomoea pubescens Lam. – silky morning glory
 Ipomoea pulcherrima Ooststr.
 Ipomoea puncticulata Benth.
 Ipomoea punicea (Silva Manso) Choisy
 Ipomoea purga (Wender.) Hayne – Vera Cruz jalap
 Ipomoea purpurea (L.) Roth – common morning glory, purple morning glory, tall morning glory
 Ipomoea pyramidalis Hallier f.
 Ipomoea pyrenea Taub.
 Ipomoea pyrophila A.Chev.
 Ipomoea quamoclit L. – cypress vine, cypressvine morning glory, cardinal creeper, cardinal vine, star glory, hummingbird vine
 Ipomoea queirozii J.R.I.Wood & L.V.Vasconc.
 Ipomoea racemigera F.Muell. & Tate
 Ipomoea racemosa Poir.
 Ipomoea ramboi O'Donell
 Ipomoea ramosissima (Poir.) Choisy
 Ipomoea recta De Wild.
 Ipomoea reflexa Span.
 Ipomoea reflexisepala Lejoly & Lisowski
 Ipomoea regnellii Meisn.
 Ipomoea repanda Jacq.
 Ipomoea reticulata O'Donell
 Ipomoea retropilosa (Pittier) D.F.Austin
 Ipomoea revoluta J.R.I.Wood & Scotland
 Ipomoea rhomboidea House
 Ipomoea richardsiae Verdc.
 Ipomoea riograndensis P.P.A.Ferreira & Miotto
 Ipomoea riparum Standl. & L.O.Williams
 Ipomoea robbrechtii Lejoly & Lisowski
 Ipomoea robertsiana Rendle
 Ipomoea robinsonii House
 Ipomoea robusta Urb.
 Ipomoea robynsiana Lejoly & Lisowski
 Ipomoea rojasii Hassl.
 Ipomoea rosea Choisy
 Ipomoea rotundata Verdc.
 Ipomoea rubens Choisy
 Ipomoea rubriflora O'Donell
 Ipomoea rumicifolia Choisy
 Ipomoea rupestris Sim.-Bianch. & Pirani
 Ipomoea rupicola House – cliff morning glory
 Ipomoea rzedowskii E.Carranza, Zamudio & Murguía
 Ipomoea sagittata Poir. – saltmarsh morning glory
 Ipomoea sagittifolia Burm.f.
 Ipomoea saintronanensis R.W.Johnson
 Ipomoea salicifolia Roxb.
 Ipomoea salsettensis Santapau & Patel
 Ipomoea santacruzensis O'Donell
 Ipomoea santillanii O'Donell
 Ipomoea saopaulista O'Donell
 Ipomoea schaffneri S.Watson
 Ipomoea schaijesii Lejoly & Lisowski
 Ipomoea schomburgkii Choisy
 Ipomoea schulziana O'Donell
 Ipomoea scopulina J.R.I.Wood & Scotland
 Ipomoea scopulorum Brandegee
 Ipomoea seaania Felger & Austin
 Ipomoea seducta House
 Ipomoea selleana Urb.
 Ipomoea sepacuitensis Donn.Sm.
 Ipomoea sericophylla Meisn.
 Ipomoea sericosepala J.R.I.Wood & Scotland
 Ipomoea serrana Sim.-Bianch. & L.V.Vasconc.
 Ipomoea sescossiana Baill.
 Ipomoea setifera Poir.
 Ipomoea setosa Ker Gawl. – Brazilian morning glory
 Ipomoea shirambensis Baker
 Ipomoea shumardiana (Torr.) Shinners – narrow-leaved morning glory
 Ipomoea shupangensis Baker
 Ipomoea sidamensis Thulin
 Ipomoea sidifolia Schrad.
 Ipomoea silvicola House
 Ipomoea simonsiana Rendle
 Ipomoea simplex Thunb.
 Ipomoea simulans D.Hanb. – Tampico jalap
 Ipomoea sindica Stapf
 Ipomoea sofomarensis Sebsebe
 Ipomoea sororia D.F.Austin & J.L.Tapia
 Ipomoea spathulata Hallier f.
 Ipomoea spectata J.A.McDonald
 Ipomoea sphenophylla Urb.
 Ipomoea spinulifera J.R.I.Wood & Scotland
 Ipomoea splendor-sylvae House
 Ipomoea spruceana Benth. ex Meisn.
 Ipomoea squamisepala O'Donell
 Ipomoea squamosa Choisy
 Ipomoea stans Cav.
 Ipomoea staphylina Roem. & Schult.
 Ipomoea steerei (Standl.) L.O.William
 Ipomoea stenophylla Meisn.
 Ipomoea stenosiphon Hallier f.
 Ipomoea steudelii Millsp. – Steudel's morning glory
 Ipomoea stibaropoda Ooststr.
 Ipomoea stocksii C.B.Clarke
 Ipomoea stuckertii O'Donell
 Ipomoea suaveolens (M.Martens & Galeotti) Hemsl.
 Ipomoea subincana (Choisy) Meisn.
 Ipomoea subrevoluta Choisy
 Ipomoea subspicata (Meisn.) O'Donell
 Ipomoea subtomentosa (Chodat & Hassl.) O'Donell
 Ipomoea suburceolata O'Donell
 Ipomoea suffruticosa Burch.
 Ipomoea suffulta (Kunth) G.Don
 Ipomoea sulina P.P.A.Ferreira & Miotto
 Ipomoea sulphurea (La Llave) G.Don
 Ipomoea sultani Chiov.
 Ipomoea sumatrana (Miq.) Ooststr.
 Ipomoea syringifolia Meisn.
 Ipomoea tabascana J.A.McDonald & D.F.Austin
 Ipomoea tacambarensis E.Carranza
 Ipomoea tarijensis O'Donell
 Ipomoea tastensis Brandegee from Baja California Sur
 Ipomoea tehuantepecensis L.Torres, R.Torres, M.P.Ramírez & J.A.McDonald
 Ipomoea temascaltepecensis Wilkin
 Ipomoea tenera Meisn.
 Ipomoea tentaculifera Greenm.
 Ipomoea tenuifolia (Vahl) Kuntze
 Ipomoea tenuiloba Torr. – spiderleaf
 Ipomoea tenuipes Verdc.
 Ipomoea tenuirostris Choisy
 Ipomoea tenuissima Choisy – rockland morning glory
 Ipomoea teotitlanica McPherson
 Ipomoea ternata Jacq.
 Ipomoea ternifolia Cav. – triple-leaved morning glory
 Ipomoea theodori O'Donell
 Ipomoea thunbergioides Welw.
 Ipomoea thurberi A.Gray – Thurber's morning glory
 Ipomoea ticcopa Verdc.
 Ipomoea tiliacea (Willd.) Choisy
 Ipomoea tolmerana R.W.Johnson
 Ipomoea transvaalensis A.Meeuse
 Ipomoea trichosperma Blume
 Ipomoea tricolor Cav. – Mexican morning glory
 Ipomoea trifida (Kunth) G.Don Wild ancestor of the sweet potato
 Ipomoea triflora Forssk.
 Ipomoea triloba L. – Krug's white morning glory, littlebell, Aiea morning glory
 Ipomoea trinervia Schulze-Menz
 Ipomoea tuberculata Ker Gawl.
 Ipomoea tubiflora Hook.f.
 Ipomoea tuboides O.Deg. & Ooststr. – Hawaii morning glory
 Ipomoea ugborea  Ogunw.
 Ipomoea uninervis J.R.I.Wood & Scotland
 Ipomoea urbaniana (Dammer) Hallier f.
 Ipomoea urbinei House
 Ipomoea uruguayensis Meisn.
 Ipomoea vagans Baker
 Ipomoea valenzuelensis Chodat & Hassl.
 Ipomoea variifolia Meisn.
 Ipomoea veadeirosii J.R.I.Wood & Scotland
 Ipomoea velardei O'Donell
 Ipomoea velutina R.Br.
 Ipomoea velutinifolia J.R.I.Wood & Scotland
 Ipomoea venosa (Desr.) Roem. & Schult.
 Ipomoea verbasciformis (Meisn.) O'Donell
 Ipomoea verbascoidea Choisy
 Ipomoea verdcourtiana Lejoly & Lisowski
 Ipomoea vernalis R.E.Fr.
 Ipomoea verrucisepala Verdc.
 Ipomoea verruculosa (Pittier) O'Donell
 Ipomoea versipellis R.W.Johnson
 Ipomoea vestalii Standl.
 Ipomoea villifera House
 Ipomoea violacea L. – beach moonflower, sea moonflower
 Ipomoea virgata Meisn.
 Ipomoea viridis Choisy
 Ipomoea vivianae Krapov.
 Ipomoea volcanensis O'Donell
 Ipomoea walpersiana Duchass. ex Urb.
 Ipomoea walteri J.R.I.Wood & Scotland
 Ipomoea wangii C.Y.Wu
 Ipomoea welwitschii Vatke ex Hallier f.
 Ipomoea wightii (Wall.) Choisy
 Ipomoea wolcottiana Rose
 Ipomoea yaracuyensis J.R.Grande & W.Meier
 Ipomoea yardiensis A.S.George
 Ipomoea zanzibarica Verdc.
 Ipomoea zimmermanii J.A.McDonald

Horticultural hybrids
 Ipomoea × multifida
 Ipomoea × sloteri

Formerly placed here 

 Ellisia nyctelea (L.) L. (as I. nyctelea L.)
 Jacquemontia ovalifolia (as I. ovalifolia Choisy)
 Jacquemontia tamnifolia (L.) Griseb. (as I. tamnifolia L.)
 Merremia aegyptia (L.) Urb. (as I. aegyptia L.)
 Merremia cissoides (Lam.) Hallier f. (as I. cissoides (Lam.) Griseb.)
 Merremia discoidesperma (Donn. Sm.) O'Donell (as I. discoidesperma Donn. Sm.)
 Merremia dissecta (Jacq.) Hallier f. (as I. dissecta (Jacq.) Pursh or I. sinuata Ortega)
 Merremia emarginata (Burm. f.) Hallier f. (as I. reniformis (Roxb.) Sweet)
 Merremia kingii (Prain) Kerr (as I. kingii Prain)
 Merremia mammosa (Lour.) Hallier f. (as I. mammosa (Lour.) Choisy)
 Merremia peltata (L.) Merr. (as I. nymphaeifolia Blume)
 Merremia pterygocaulos (Choisy) Hallier f. (as I. pterygocaulos Choisy)
 Merremia quinquefolia (L.) Hallier f. (as I. quinquefolia L.)
 Merremia sibirica (L.) Hallier f. (as I. sibirica (L.) Pers.)
 Merremia tuberosa (L.) Rendle (as I. tuberosa L.)
 Merremia umbellata (L.) Hallierf. (as I. polyanthes Roem. & Schult. or I. pterodes Choisy)
 Operculina aequisepala (Domin) R.W.Johnson (as I. aequisepala Domin)
 Operculina hamiltonii (G.Don) D.F.Austin & Staples (I. hamiltonii G.Don)
 Operculina turpethum (L.) Silva Manso (as I. turpethum (L.) R.Br.)
 Piper kadsura (Choisy) Ohwi (as I. kadsura Choisy)
 Stictocardia macalusoi (Mattei) Verdc. (as I. macalusoi Mattei)
 Stictocardia tiliifolia (Desr.) Hallier f. (as I. campanulata L.)
 Turbina corymbosa (L.) Raf. (as I. burmannii Choisy)
 Xenostegia medium (L.) D.F.Austin & Staples (as I. medium (L.) Druce)
 Xenostegia tridentata (L.) D.F.Austin & Staples (as I. angustifolia Jacq.)

References 

Ipomoea
Ipomoea